South Dakota's at-large congressional district is the sole congressional district for the state of South Dakota. Based on area, it is the fourth largest congressional district in the nation.

The district is currently represented by Dusty Johnson.

History

The district was created when South Dakota achieved statehood on November 2, 1889, electing two members at-large (statewide). Following the 1910 Census a third seat was gained, with the legislature drawing three separate districts. The third district was eliminated after the 1930 Census. As a result of the redistricting cycle after the 1980 Census, the second seat was eliminated, creating a single at-large district. Since 1983, South Dakota has retained a single congressional district.

Voter registration

Statewide election results

Election history

2004 special 
Incumbent U.S. Representative Bill Janklow resigned the seat on January 20, 2004, after he was convicted of second-degree manslaughter, triggering a special election. Democrat Stephanie Herseth was selected as the Democratic nominee for this special election and she defeated Republican Larry Diedrich with 51 percent of the vote in a close-fought election on June 1, 2004. Herseth's victory briefly gave the state its first all-Democratic congressional delegation since 1937.

2004 general 
In the November general election, Herseth was elected to a full term with 53.4 percent of the vote, an increase of a few percentage points compared with the even closer June special elections. Herseth's vote margin in June was about 3,000 votes, but by November it had grown to over 29,000.

Herseth thereby became the first woman in state history to win a full term in the U.S. Congress.

Both elections were hard-fought and close compared to many House races in the rest of the United States, and the special election was watched closely by a national audience. The general election was also viewed as one of the most competitive in the country, but was overshadowed in the state by the highly competitive U.S. Senate race between Democrat Tom Daschle and Republican John Thune, which Thune narrowly won.

2006

2008

2010

2012

2014

2016

2018

2020

2022

List of members representing the district

1889–1913: Two then three seats 
Two seats were created in 1889.

In 1913, the two at-large seats were replaced by three districts. There were no at-large seats, therefore, until 1983.

1983–present: One seat 
By 1983, the remaining two district seats were reduced to one at-large seat.

References

 Congressional Biographical Directory of the United States 1774–present

External links
2004 campaign finance data

At-large
At-large United States congressional districts
Constituencies established in 1889
1889 establishments in South Dakota
Constituencies disestablished in 1913
1913 disestablishments in South Dakota
Constituencies established in 1983
1983 establishments in South Dakota